is an action role-playing video game developed by Mistwalker and tri-Crescendo and published by Namco Bandai in Japan and Europe and D3 Publisher in North America, for the Nintendo DS video game console and is part of the Blue Dragon series, its third installment and is a direct sequel to both Blue Dragon and Blue Dragon Plus. Hironobu Sakaguchi (series creator), Akira Toriyama (character designer) and Hideo Baba (brand manager of Tales series) are involved in the development of the game. It was released in Japan on October 8, 2009, in North America on May 18, 2010, and in the PAL region in September 2010.

Gameplay 

In contrast to its predecessors, which were a traditional turn-based RPG and a strategy RPG, respectively, Blue Dragon: Awakened Shadow is an action RPG with real time combat. The player is able to explore 3D fields, attack enemies directly as well as call upon shadows.

The game allows the player to customize their character's appearance, such as their gender, hairstyles, eyebrows, eyes, voices, among other traits. Players are able to use their customized characters in multiplayer with two other friends, locally or online.

Characters 

For the first time in the series, the player does not play as Shu and his companions. Instead the player will play as an unnamed customizable protagonist. Shu and his friends are not playable characters, but AI controlled party members.

Reception 

The game received "mixed" reviews according to the review aggregation website Metacritic. In Japan, Famitsu gave it a score of two eights, one seven, and one eight for a total of 31 out of 40. 1Up.com summarized the magazine's stance on the game as "a solid standard action RPG but not an exceptional game". Famitsu praised the amount of extra content put into the game such as character customization, item synthesis and boss battles. However, they noted that with the battles on the lower screen of the DS and the status on the upper screen it may cause some problems for the player. They also noted that there was a large amount of cutscenes in the game which may make the player "feel like a passive viewer at times".

Notes

References

External links 
 

2009 video games
Action role-playing video games
Bandai Namco games
Blue Dragon (franchise)
D3 Publisher games
Mistwalker games
Multiplayer and single-player video games
Nintendo DS games
Nintendo DS-only games
Tri-Crescendo games
Video game sequels
Video games developed in Japan
Video games featuring protagonists of selectable gender
Video games scored by Nobuo Uematsu